Pope Siricius (334 – 26 November 399) was the bishop of Rome from December 384 to his death. In response to inquiries from Bishop Himerius of Tarragona, Siricius issued the Directa decretal, containing decrees of baptism, church discipline and other matters. His are the oldest completely preserved papal decretals. He is sometimes said to have been the first bishop of Rome to call himself pope.

Early life 

Siricius was a native of Rome; his father's name was Tiburtius. Siricius entered the service of the Church at an early age and, according to the testimony of the inscription on his grave, was lector and then deacon of the Roman Church during the pontificate of Liberius.

Pontificate

After the death of Damasus I, Siricius was elected pope unanimously, despite attempts by Ursinus to promote himself. Emperor Valentinian II's confirmation of his election stilled any further objections. Siricius was an active pope, involved in the administration of the Church and the handling of various factions and viewpoints within it. In response to a letter from Bishop Himerius of Tarragona, he issued the Directa decretal, containing decisions on fifteen different points, on matters regarding baptism, penance, church discipline and the celibacy of the clergy. His are the oldest completely preserved decretals.

Heresies
According to the life in the "Liber Pontificalis" (ed. Duchesne, I, 216), Siricius also took severe measures against the Manichæans at Rome. However, as Duchesne remarks (loc. cit., notes) it cannot be assumed from the writings of the converted Augustine of Hippo, who was a Manichæan when he went to Rome (383), that Siricius took any particular steps against them, yet Augustine would certainly have commented on this if such had been the case. The mention in the "Liber Pontificalis" belongs properly to the life of Pope Leo I. Neither is it probable, as Langen thinks (Gesch. der röm. Kirche, I, 633), that Priscillianists are to be understood by this mention of Manichæans, although probably Priscillianists were at times called Manichæans in the writings of that age. The western emperors, including Honorius and Valentinian III, issued laws against the Manichæans, whom they declared to be political offenders, and took severe action against the members of this sect (Codex Theodosian, XVI, V, various laws).

In the East, Siricius interposed to settle the Meletian schism at Antioch; this schism had continued notwithstanding the death in 381 of Meletius at the Council of Constantinople. The followers of Meletius elected Flavian as his successor, while the adherents of Bishop Paulinus, after the death of this bishop (388), elected Evagrius. Evagrius died in 392 and through Flavian's management no successor was elected. By the mediation of  St. John Chrysostom and Theophilus of Alexandria an embassy, led by Bishop Acacius of Beroea, was sent to Rome to persuade Siricius to recognize Flavian and to readmit him to communion with the Church.

When the Spanish bishop and ascetic Priscillian, accused by his fellow bishops of heresy, was executed by Emperor Magnus Maximus under the charge of magic, Siricius—along with Ambrose of Milan and Martin of Tours—protested against the verdict to the emperor.

Papal titles
Siricius is sometimes said to be the first bishop of Rome to style himself pope, but other authorities say the title pope was from the early 3rd century an honorific designation used for any bishop in the West. In the East it was used only for the patriarch of Alexandria. Marcellinus (d. 304) is the first bishop of Rome shown in sources to have had the title pope used of him. From the 6th century, the imperial chancery of Constantinople normally reserved this designation for the bishop of Rome. From the early 6th century, it began to be confined in the West to the bishop of Rome, a practice that was firmly in place by the 11th century.

Siricius is also one of the popes presented in various sources as having been the first to bear the title pontifex maximus. Others that are said to have been the first to bear the title are Callistus I, Damasus I, Leo I, and Gregory I. The Oxford Dictionary of the Christian Church indicates instead that it was in the fifteenth century (when the Renaissance stirred up new interest in ancient Rome) that pontifex maximus became a regular title of honour for popes.

Death and veneration
Siricius died on 26 November 399 and was succeeded by Anastasius I. He is buried in the basilica of San Silvestro. His feast day is 26 November.

See also 

 List of Catholic saints
 List of popes

References

External links 

 Opera Omnia by Migne Patrologia Latina

 
334 births
399 deaths
4th-century Christian saints
4th-century Romans
Papal saints
4th-century popes
Popes